Giulio Cesare Procaccini (1574–1625) was an Italian painter and sculptor of the early Baroque era in Milan.

Biography
Born in Bologna he was son of the  Mannerist painter Ercole Procaccini the Elder and brother of Camillo Procaccini and Carlo Antonio Procaccini. The family moved to Milan around 1585 with the help of the rich art collector Pirro Visconti.

He began as a sculptor  in the  Cathedral and in the Milanese church of Santa Maria presso San Celso. In 1610 he  painted six of the Quadroni, large canvases celebrating Saint Charles Borromeo.

Among his many altarpieces are   the Circumcision (c.1616) now in Galleria Estense, Modena, and the Last Supper (1616) for Convent associated with the Basilica della Santissima Annunziata del Vastato in Genoa. He also painted the Scourging of Christ. In 1620 for the Church of Santa Maria di Canepanova in Pavia he painted two canvases depicting Debora who has the army gather and Rachel with Jacob at the well and, still in the same city, Saint Teresa for the church of Santa Maria delle Grazie.

He worked with Giovanni Battista Crespi (il Cerano) and Pier Francesco Mazzucchelli (il Morazzone)  following the directions of Cardinal Federico Borromeo, patron of the arts and cousin of Charles Borromeo.From that time there is a beautiful garland that Procaccini made in collaboration with the Flemish painter Jan Brueghel, who was also working for Cardinal Borromeo at that time, belongs to the Prado Museum collections and comes from the Spanish royal collection. He also painted small religious canvases for rich families, in Milan and in Genoa, where he saw the works of Rubens.

His style shows the influence of Bolognese mannerism and Venetian colorism and marks the beginning of the Baroque.

Gallery

Partial anthology
Coronation of the Virgin 
Virgin with Saints Francis and Dominic; institution of the Rosary 
Ecce Homo, 1615–1620, today at the Dallas Museum of Art

References

Procaccini exhibition.
 Domenico Sedini, Giulio Cesare Procaccini , online catalogue Artgate by Fondazione Cariplo, 2010, CC BY-SA.

Other projects

1574 births
1625 deaths
16th-century Italian painters
Italian male painters
17th-century Italian painters
Painters from Milan
Painters from Bologna
Italian Baroque painters